"OMG" is a song recorded by South Korean girl group NewJeans for their first single album, OMG. The single album was released by ADOR, a subsidiary of Hybe Corporation, on January 2, 2023, as the lead single of the album.

Background 
"OMG" came five months after NewJeans released their commercially successful first extended play, New Jeans, and the three lead singles, "Cookie", "Attention" and "Hype Boy". On November 10, 2022, during Hybe Corporation's annual community press conference on YouTube, CEO Jiwon Park announced that NewJeans will have a comeback on January 2, 2023, with their first single album, OMG.

Release and promotion 
Following the announcement of the release, on November 10, 2022, it was revealed that the single album would include the eponymous title track, as well as a pre-release single, which would be released on December 19, 2022. The first teasers for the album were released on December 12. As scheduled, NewJeans released the music video for "OMG" which was directed by Shin Woo-seok and the single was released through several music portals including iTunes and Melon.

Music and lyrics 
The song was written by group member Hanni, Gigi, and Ylva Dimberg who also worked on composing with David Dawood and  Park Jin-su. "OMG" is written in both English and Korean and is composed in the key of F major, with a tempo of 127 beats per minute. In a brief statement to South Korean media outlets, ADOR CEO Min Hee-jin said that the track is based on the hip hop drum source and percussion, and is a "bouncy and exciting" hip hop R&B song created by going back and forth between UK garage and trap rhythms.

Critical reception 
Writing for Pitchfork, Joshua Minsoo Kim described "OMG" as a "soft, minimalist R&B" track that "offers a sweet portrait of private longing". NMEs Rhian Daly gave "OMG" a four out of five stars rating, calling it "a fusion that brilliantly matches the song's subject matter: the moment before you confess your feelings for someone and find out if they feel the same".

Accolades

Credits and personnel 
Credits are adapted from Melon.

 Gigi – lyrics
 Hanni (NewJeans) – lyrics
 Ylva Dimberg – lyrics, composition
 David Dawood – composition
 Park Jin-su – composition, instrumental, programming

Charts

Weekly charts

Monthly charts

Release history

References 

2023 singles
2023 songs
Hybe Corporation singles
Korean-language songs
NewJeans songs
Number-one singles in Singapore